Be-Bop Deluxe were an English rock band who achieved critical acclaim and moderate commercial success during the mid to late 1970s.

History

Be-Bop Deluxe 
Be-Bop Deluxe was founded in Wakefield, West Yorkshire, England, by singer, guitarist and principal songwriter Bill Nelson in 1972. The founding line-up consisted of Nelson, guitarist Ian Parkin, bassist and vocalist Robert Bryan, drummer Nicholas Chatterton-Dew, and keyboardist Richard Brown (who left in December of that year). They started off playing the West Yorkshire pub scene, with one regular venue being the Staging Post in Whinmoor, Leeds.  They never played bebop music, but instead came out of the blues-based British rock scene of the late 1960s. At first they were compared to the more successful David Bowie, but Nelson never tried to copy Bowie, and appears to have disliked comparisons or being pigeon-holed.

After signing to EMI's Harvest Records subsidiary, the initial line-up of the band only lasted for one album, 1974's Axe Victim, and a short tour. Shortly after this, Nelson dissolved the band and reformed with a new line-up with bassist Paul Jeffreys, keyboardist Milton Reame-James (both formerly of Cockney Rebel) and drummer Simon Fox, the latter introduced by Reame-James to Nelson. However, Jeffreys and Reame-James soon departed the band, and New Zealand-born bassist-vocalist Charlie Tumahai (formerly of Australian bands Mississippi and Healing Force) joined in late 1974. This line-up recorded 1975's Futurama album (produced by Roy Thomas Baker, the then producer for Queen) and was then supplemented by keyboardist Andrew Clark for the subsequent tour, after which Clark joined the band. This final line-up remained constant until the band's dissolution in 1978. Jeffreys died in the bombing of Pan Am Flight 103 over Lockerbie, Scotland in 1988.

Stylistically, the songs took elements from progressive rock, glam rock (the band had flirted with make-up in the early days) and hard guitar rock. "Ships in the Night", taken from the band's third album Sunburst Finish, was their most successful single in both the UK and the US. The single features an alto saxophone solo by Ian Nelson.
The album was notably the first to be produced by EMI employee John Leckie, who had hitherto worked for the company as a recording engineer, in which capacity he had served on Axe Victim, which he also in effect produced. It was clearly a happy relationship: Leckie would go on to produce all the subsequent Be-Bop Deluxe and Bill Nelson's Red Noise albums for Harvest, including the proposed Red Noise album Quit Dreaming And Get On The Beam that Harvest refused to release. Nelson shared producing credits with Leckie from Drastic Plastic onward.

The first three Be-Bop Deluxe albums are all, in one way or another, named after guitars. "Axe" is slang for a guitar, "Futurama" is a particular make of guitar, while "Sunburst Finish" refers to a style of finishing for the instrument.

The title track of the fourth album, Modern Music, was a ten-minute suite of songs inspired by the experience of the band's touring the US.  This was followed by the live album, Live! In The Air Age, recorded on the subsequent UK tour promoting Modern Music although no songs from that studio album appeared on the live one, apart from a tantalizing snippet of the audience singing along to "Down On Terminal Street". That recording – now featuring the song in its entirety – and a number of other live Modern Music tracks finally surfaced on 2011's five-CD set Futurist Manifesto.

1978's Drastic Plastic, recorded at Juan-Les-Pins in the South of France with influences of punk, new wave and David Bowie's Berlin albums, was a substantial stylistic change from the progressive/guitar rock of the early Be-Bop Deluxe. Eager to embrace the changing musical landscape, Nelson dissolved Be-Bop Deluxe.

The band appeared three times on BBC's The Old Grey Whistle Test, performing a total of six songs and once on Top of the Pops, with their 1976 single, "Ships In The Night."  For the band's Sight & Sound concert in 1978 the setlist was made up entirely of tracks from the Drastic Plastic album.

After Be-Bop Deluxe
Immediately thereafter,  Nelson formed a new band, Bill Nelson's Red Noise, retaining Andy Clark on keyboards, and adding his brother Ian on saxophone, in which capacity the latter had previously contributed to "Ships in the Night". An album followed. Nelson has subsequently released numerous albums and singles under his own name, frequently playing all instruments himself.

Nelson planned a four-guitarist, two-drummer band in the 1990s with his brother, but it never materialised; in 1992, Nelson released his own demos for this band as Blue Moons And Laughing Guitars on Virgin. In 1995, former Be-Bop Deluxe members Ian Parkin and Charlie Tumahai both died. In 2004, Sound on Sound magazine, whose website hosts Nelson's online shop and is named after Red Noise's Sound-on-Sound album put up the money for Nelson to take his seven-piece band Bill Nelson and the Lost Satellites, originally formed to play the 2002 Nelsonica convention, on tour around the UK as The Be Bop Deluxe And Beyond Tour. The drummer for the tour was Nick Dew who, under the name Nicholas Chatterton-Dew, had played with Be-Bop Deluxe in the early days. The sax player was Ian Nelson, who died two years later in 2006.

Nelson subsequently put together the seven-piece Bill Nelson and the Gentlemen Rocketeers, which included Dave Sturt (bass) and Theo Travis (assorted woodwind, brass), and, once again, Nick Dew on drums, to play songs with vocals from the extensive Be-Bop Deluxe/Bill Nelson back catalogue at his annual Nelsonica event in Yorkshire. In March 2011, the band played live to cameras at Metropolis Studios, London. Initially released on DVD, the resultant video and audio recording has subsequently been reissued on other formats including CD and LP. However, having signed away his rights to these recordings, Nelson has made no money on any of the Metropolis Studios releases.

In 2011, EMI upgraded the Be-Bop Deluxe catalogue remastered by Peter Mew featuring all of the band's original albums. EMI and Bill Nelson chose to include all of the band's albums, single edits and B-sides as part of this release with the exception of the pre-Axe Victim, independently released Smile single "Teenage Archangel" / "Jets At Dawn", as part of this set. Although Nelson did not supervise the release, he gave final approval on the remasters and agreed to provide a disc of rarities to help sell the set, if EMI paid him royalties on the release. The two Smile tracks can be found on the compilation Postcards From the Future... Introducing Be-Bop Deluxe (2004) and Nelson's 40-year career retrospective, eight CD set, The Practice Of Everyday Life (2011).

Despite Be-Bop Deluxe's commercial success, Bill Nelson stated that he had never received royalties for the earlier CD release of his back catalog on EMI until the 2011 CD reissue/remaster of his back catalogue.

Musical style 

Be-Bop Deluxe were initially a glam rock band that incorporated elements of progressive rock, blues and folk rock into their musical style. After the band received unfavorable comparisons to the music of David Bowie, leader Bill Nelson initiated a shift in the band's style to emphasise a more experimental sound. This new sound has been classified as art rock, heavy metal, progressive rock, pop rock and progressive pop. With their final album, Drastic Plastic, Be-Bop Deluxe again expanded their style to include influences new wave music. Science fiction imagery was common in the lyrics, along with the more traditional themes of love and the human condition.

Members
 Bill Nelson – lead guitar, lead vocals, keyboards (1972–1978)
 Robert Bryan – bass, lead vocals (1972–1974)
 Nicholas Chatterton-Dew – drums, backing vocals, percussion (1972–1974)
 Ian Parkin – rhythm and acoustic guitars (1972–1974; died 1995)
 Richard Brown – keyboards (1972)
 Simon Fox – drums, percussion (1974–1978)
 Paul Jeffreys – bass (1974; died 1988)
 Milton Reame-James – keyboards (1974)
 Charlie Tumahai – bass, backing vocals (1974–1978; died 1995)
 Andrew Clark – keyboards (1975–1978)

Timeline

Line-ups

Discography

Studio albums
 Axe Victim (1974) Harvest
 Futurama (1975) Harvest
 Sunburst Finish (1976) UK No. 17 Harvest
 Modern Music (3 September 1976) UK No. 12Harvest
 Drastic Plastic (1978) No. 22Harvest

Live albums
 Live! In the Air Age (1977) UK No. 10Harvest
 Radioland (1994) BBC Radio 1 live in concert 1976 Windsong
 Tremulous Antenna (2002) (Radioland remastered) Hux

Singles
 "Teenage Archangel" / "Jets at Dawn" (1973) Smile
 "Jet Silver and the Dolls of Venus" / "Third Floor Heaven" (1974) Harvest
 "Between the Worlds" / "Lights" (1975) recalled after only one day of sale Harvest
 "Maid in Heaven" / "Lights" (1975) Harvest
 "Ships in the Night" / "Crying to the Sky" (1976) – UK No. 23 Harvest
 "Kiss of Light" / "Shine" (1976) Harvest
 "Japan" / "Futurist Manifesto" (1977) Harvest
 "Panic in the World" / "Blue as a Jewel" (1978) Harvest
 "Electrical Language" / "Surreal Estate" (1978) Harvest

DVDs
Picture House (2010) [Bill Nelson] Nelsonica convention DVD includes Be-Bop Deluxe in the South of France, Nelson's video diary shot during the Drastic Plastic sessions Visuluxe
Be-Bop Deluxe at the BBC 1974–78 (2013) 3-CD + DVD box set of previously unreleased material + material from Tramcar to Tomorrow (most tracks) and Tremulous Antenna (all tracks) + televised performances EMI
Classic Rock Magazine Legends Bill Nelson and the Gentlemen Rocketeers filmed live at Metropolis Studios (2011)  [Bill Nelson and the Gentlemen Rocketeers] performance of songs from Be-Bop Deluxe/Bill Nelson's back catalogue ITV Studios Home Entertainment

Compilation albums
 The Best of and the Rest of Be-Bop Deluxe (1978) 2-LP set; second disc material previously unreleased on LP - Drastic Plastic outtakes plus single A- and B-sides Harvest
 Singles A's & B's (1981) Harvest Heritage
 Bop to the Red Noise (1986) (mixture of Be-Bop Deluxe, and Bill Nelson's Red Noise material) Dojo 
 The Best of Be-Bop Deluxe: Raiding the Divine Archive (1990) Harvest
 Air Age Anthology: The Very Best of Be-Bop Deluxe (1997) 2-CD set EMI
 The Very Best of Be-Bop Deluxe (1998) EMI-Capitol Special Markets
 Tramcar to Tomorrow (1998) John Peel BBC Radio 1 Sessions 1974-8 Hux
  Electrotype: The Holyground Recordings 1968–1972 (2001) Bill Nelson previously unreleased pre-Axe Victim Bill Nelson, and Be-Bop Deluxe recordings Holyground
 Postcards from the Future... Introducing Be-Bop Deluxe (2004) EMI
 Futurist Manifesto (2011) 5-CD set, 1st four discs are the five Be-Bop Deluxe studio albums plus the singles; fifth disc is previously unreleased material from demos and Live! In the Air Age recordings Harvest
 The Practice of Everyday Life (2011) [Bill Nelson] 8-CD set, 40-year career retrospective mixture of Be-Bop Deluxe, Bill Nelson's Red Noise, and Bill Nelson solo material Esoteric Recordings
 Original Albums Series (2014) 5-CD set, five discs are the five Be-Bop Deluxe studio albums, tracks as originally released on LP Warner/Parlophone

Compilation singles
 Hot Valves: "Maid in Heaven", "Bring Back the Spark" / "Blazing Apostles", "Jet Silver and the Dolls of Venus" EP (1976) UK No. 36 Harvest
 Permanent Flame (The Beginners Guide to Bill Nelson) (1983) [Bill Nelson] 5-disc set of previously released Be-Bop Deluxe, Bill Nelson's Red Noise, and Bill Nelson solo material Cocteau

Bibliography
Reeves, Paul Sutton Music in Dreamland Bill Nelson & Be-Bop Deluxe (2008) Helter Skelter publishing

References

External links
Discography at the Bill Nelson Permanent Flame site
BobbyShred's Be-Bop Deluxe Page

English art rock groups
English glam rock groups
Harvest Records artists
Musical groups established in 1972
Musical groups disestablished in 1978
Musical groups from Wakefield